Quinn Sutton is an American business professional. He is the Executive Director of the Digital Alliance Foundation and is known for his work in the private technology education sector  and his work on a variety of UN-related and humanitarian projects.  In 2007, he co-founded the Digital Alliance Foundation which provides capacity-building Information and Communications Technologies (ICT) skills to marginalized populations and serves as a High-Level Advisor for the Global Alliance for Information and Communication Technologies and Development (UNGAID).

International work
 United Nations Economic Commission for Africa Committee on Development Information, Fifth Session (CODI V),  Addis Ababa, Ethiopia. May, 2007.
 “Bridging the Digital Divide: Successful Innovations in Private-Public Sector Partnerships”, Massachusetts Institute of Technology (MIT), Learning International Networks Consortium, Her Majesty Queen Rania Al-Abdullah of Jordan – Patron,  Amman, Jordan and Dubai, UAE, October, 2007.
 Panel on Volunteerism in the Digital Age, Global Knowledge Partnership Foundation, Third Global Knowledge Conference, Kuala Lumpur, Malaysia, December 2007.
Third Joint Facilitation Meeting for Action Lines C2 (Information and Communication Infrastructure), C6 (Enabling Environment) and C4 (Capacity Building), World Summit on the Information Society, International Telecommunication Union, Geneva, Switzerland, May, 2008.
 UNGAID Annual Global Forum, Monterrey, Mexico, September, 2009.
 IT Training Project at School for Leprosy-affected Children, Chennai, India, November, 2011.
 Panel: ICT and New Strategic Alliances to Achieve the Millennium Goals, Infopoverty World Conference, OCCAM, UN Headquarters, New York, March, 2012.
 Panel: The Impact of New Technologies and ICTs on Sustainable Development, United Nations Conference on Sustainable Development (RIO+20), Rio de Janeiro, Brazil.
 United Nations-sponsored Education Policy Paper: “Framework on Education for All in the Digital Age”, 2009.

References

American technology chief executives
Brigham Young University alumni
Living people
Pepperdine University alumni
Year of birth missing (living people)